Chen Chen-hsiang (born 10 October 1942) is a Taiwanese politician and a retired army general. He served as the Army Commander-in-chief before retirement, and elected into the Eighth Legislative Yuan from 2012 to 2016 and has been the Vice Chairperson of Kuomintang (KMT) since 23 November 2016.

Kuomintang

2016 Beijing visit
Chen was part of a Kuomintang delegation which visited Beijing at the end of December 2016 to hold a dialogue with the Communist Party of China (CPC). The meeting with Taiwan Affairs Office Director Zhang Zhijun focused on exchanges between KMT and CPC officials, exchanges between young people between the two sides and protection of the people's rights and interests. They attended a trade fair on 24 December 2016 to promote agricultural products and tourism from Hualien County, Hsinchu County, Kinmen County, Lienchiang County, Miaoli County, Nantou County, New Taipei City and Taitung County.

References

1942 births
Living people
Republic of China Army generals
Kuomintang Members of the Legislative Yuan in Taiwan
Members of the 8th Legislative Yuan
Party List Members of the Legislative Yuan
Republic of China politicians from Anhui
Politicians from Wuhu